Gaston-Charles-Marie-Gabriel-Raphaël-Gaëtan, comte Errembault de Dudzeele (Vienna 1 September 1847 – Ixelles 3 June 1929) was a Belgian diplomat.

Biography
He served as Minister of the King of the Belgians to Serbia from 1890 to 1898, to Turkey from 1898 to 1909 and to Austria from 1909 to 1914. His father Gaston was also a diplomat. He had two children, Valentine (1875–1969), who married Count Carlo Sforza, and Gaston (1877–1961), who married Natalija, former wife of Prince Mirko of Montenegro.

References

1847 births
1929 deaths
Counts of Belgium
Ambassadors to Serbia
Ambassadors of Belgium to Turkey
Ambassadors of Belgium to Austria
Grand Officers of the Order of the Crown (Belgium)
Recipients of the Civic Decoration
Commanders Grand Cross of the Order of the Polar Star
Recipients of the Order of the Cross of Takovo
Recipients of the Order of St. Anna, 1st class